is a  Japanese manga artist. Yamada is known for creating the manga Asatte no Houkou, which also spawned an anime. Yamada also created the manga Majina! and the manga Gifuto.

He has created a mahjong game called Higurashi no Naku Koro ni Jong, which is based on 07th Expansion's Higurashi When They Cry. It began appearing once a month in Takeshobo's Kindai Mahjong magazine starting on January 1, 2010.

Works

Books
 Code Geass: Lelouch of the Rebellion — Knight: Official Comic Anthology For Girls, Volume 1 (コードギアス　反逆のルルーシュ　公式コミックアンソロジー　Ｋｎｉｇｈｔ, Asuka Comics DX) — Manga Contribution 
 JK Haru is a Sex Worker in Another World (JKハルは異世界で娼婦になった, Hayakawa Bunko JP) — Cover Illustration
 JK Haru is a Sex Worker in Another World, Manga (JKハルは異世界で娼婦になった, BUNCH COMICS) — Art

Games
 Aquarian Age (Broccoli) — Card Illustration
 Kemomimi Panic (Arclight) — Card Illustration
 Kuni Tori! Gaiden (Arclight) — Card Illustration
 Tanto Cuore: Romantic Vacation (Arclight) — Card Illustration

References

External links
J-ta Yamada's personal website 

Manga artists
Living people
Year of birth missing (living people)